Frank Griffin may also refer to:
 Frank Griffin (English footballer) (1928–2007), English football winger
 Frank Griffin (director) (1886–1953), American film director, writer and actor
 Frank Griffin (Australian footballer) (1886–1965), Australian rules footballer
 Frank Griffin (judge) (1918/19–2016), justice of the Supreme Court of Ireland
 Frank Hastings Griffin (1886–1974), American inventor